The låtfiol is a type of fiddle native to Sweden, which features two sympathetic strings running underneath the fingerboard.

According to Lennart Carlsson (see link below), fiddles with up to eight sympathetic strings were fairly common in 18th century Sweden. The similarity in construction and the geographical proximity suggests some connection with the Western Norwegian Hardanger fiddle but further research is needed to confirm this.

The word "låtfiol" translates as "tune fiddle" and is also used by Swedish folk musicians for a regular violin when used to play a tune rather than a dance.

See also
Hardanger fiddle
Nyckelharpa
Vioara cu goarnă
Kontra
Rabeca
Viola d'amore

Sources
Lennart C Nordic Music

Swedish musical instruments
Fiddles
String instruments with sympathetic strings